William Peyto (before 1698 – 11 January 1734) was an English politician who sat in the House of Commons from 1715 to 1734.

Peyto was the eldest son William Peyto of Chesterton, Warwickshire and his wife Elizabeth. His father had been Sheriff of Warwickshire in 1695 and died in 1699.
The Peytos had been a significant family Warwickshire for hundreds of years, and had acquired the Chesterton estate. A William Peyto was a Member of Parliament (MP) for Warwickshire in 1420, and another had been Sheriff of Warwickshire in 1602.

At the 1715 general election, Peyto was elected as an MP for Warwickshire. A Tory and Jacobite who voted consistently against the government, he was re-elected in 1722 and 1727.

Peyto died unmarried on 11 January 1734, a few months before the 1734 election.

References 

1690s births
Year of birth uncertain
1734 deaths
People from Stratford-on-Avon District
Members of the Parliament of Great Britain for English constituencies
Tory MPs (pre-1834)
British MPs 1715–1722
British MPs 1722–1727
British MPs 1727–1734